Brama is a genus of marine ray-finned fishes from the family Bramidae, the pomfrets. Currently, there are 8 species within the genus (see below).

Characteristics
The species in the genus Brama have a compressed head and body shaped in an tapering oval with a thin caudal peduncle. The dorsal and ventral profiles of the head are convex and it has a bluntly rounded short snout. The mouth is obviously oblique with the lower jaw projecting. They have a single dorsal fin, it and the anal fin  are long based. The dorsal fin starts above the base of the pectoral fin and both it and the anal fin are similar in shape, although the dorsal fin has an obvious lobe at its anterior end. The pectoral fin is positioned low on the body and is relatively long, extending to the centre of the anal fin. The small pelvic fins are placed below the base of the pectoral fins. The caudal fin is highly concave. The body and most of the head are covered in keeled scales while the scales on the belly are not scaled.

Taxonomy
Brama was named as a genus in 1801 by the German naturalists Marcus Elieser Bloch (1723–1799) and Johann Gottlob Schneider (1750-1822). In 1823  Bory de Saint-Vincent designated Bloch's Sparus raii as its type species.

Species
Eight recognized species are in this genus:
 Brama australis Valenciennes, 1838 (southern Ray's bream)
 Brama brama (Bonnaterre, 1788) (Atlantic pomfret)
 Brama caribbea Mead, 1972 (Caribbean pomfret)
 Brama dussumieri G. Cuvier, 1831 (lesser bream)
 Brama japonica Hilgendorf, 1878 (Pacific pomfret)
 Brama myersi Mead, 1972 (Myers' pomfret)
 Brama orcini G. Cuvier, 1831 (bigtooth pomfret)
 Brama pauciradiata Moteki, Fujita & Last, 1995 (shortfin pomfret)

Distribution and range
The genus Brama is predominantly pelagic and can be found globally in the high seas, with the exception of arctic and subarctic waters. This is true with the exception of two species, Brama orcini and Brama dussumieri, which occupy shallower waters surrounding landmasses.

Commercial importance
Some Brama spp. are common and, when large, are sought after by fisheries, especially fisheries around Spain and Portugal.

Ecology
Despite it being known that these fishes are migratory, little has been reported on their migratory habits. It has been predicted that spawning takes place near the surface, as the smallest larvae are typically collected in shallow waters. It is common for bramids, including Brama spp. to be found in the stomachs of large pelagic predators, such as tuna, cod, and billfish (the Cuban billfish (Xiphias), has been reported to have a diet that consists of 37% Brama spp.). They are therefore considered to be an important forage fish for many predators.

References

 
Bramidae